Cade (1734–1756) was an important foundation sire of Thoroughbred racehorses. He was the Leading sire in Great Britain and Ireland in 1752, 1753, 1758, 1759 and 1760.

Breeding
Bred by Francis Godolphin, 2nd Earl of Godolphin, he was by the Thoroughbred foundation sire, the Godolphin Arabian. Out of Roxana (1718) (by Bald Galloway), he was a full-brother to the first son of the Goldophin Arabian, Lath (1732 bay colt). Orphaned by Roxana when he was 10 days old, he was raised on cows' milk.

Racing career
In 1740, he defeated Sedbury (1734 chestnut colt by Partner), Elephant and Blacksilver to win the King's Plate. The following year, in April, he finished second to Sedbury in the King's Plate, defeating Countess and Elephant. He then ran second in a £50 race in July 1744 to Molorro (bl. c. 1736). Cade was then sold to Thomas Meredith of Easby in 1745, for whom he ran third in a 50 guineas purse to Bucephalus (ch.g. 1738) and Starling.

Stud record
Cade was more successful as a stallion than a racehorse, becoming Leading Sire in England in 1752, 1753, 1758, 1759 and 1760. His top offspring included:
 Cade Mare: 1751 grey filly, dam of Mambrino (horse), also 19th dam of Alysheba 
 Changeling: 1747 bay colt, full-brother to Matchem, sired Le Sang 
 Kitty Fisher: 1756 grey filly, sent to the USA, in the pedigree of Boston
 Matchem: three-time leading sire, one of three sire-lines to producing modern Thoroughbreds 
 Silvio: 1754 bay colt, winner of the 1764 Richmond Gold Cup
 Warrens Sportsman: 1753 bay colt, damsire of Potoooooooo and the Derby winner Sir Thomas. 
 Wildair: 1753 bay colt, sent to the USA, eventually taken back to England
 Young Cade: 1747 bay colt, unraced but an important sire

Cade died at Easby Abbey, in September 1756.

References

External links
 Bloodlines - Cade

1734 racehorse births
1756 racehorse deaths
Racehorses bred in the Kingdom of Great Britain
Racehorses trained in the Kingdom of Great Britain
Thoroughbred family 6-a
Godolphin Arabian sire line